Gympie Road is a major road in the northern suburbs of Brisbane, Queensland, Australia.  The road forms part of the main road route from the Brisbane Central Business District (CBD) to the northern suburbs, Sunshine Coast and east coast of Queensland.

Gympie Road is designated A3 from Lutwyche Road, Kedron to the Gympie Arterial Road, Bald Hills.  The road then continues as State Route 58 to Dayboro Road, Petrie.

Gympie Road is named after the town of Gympie, north of the Sunshine Coast.

Landmarks 
Gympie Road is lined with many shops, fast food outlets, restaurants, car yards, factories, motels, caravan parks, parks and schools including:

 Kedron Park Hotel (est. 1881)
 Kedron Brook
 Lutwyche Cemetery (est. 1878)
 Top Taste
 Edinburgh Castle Hotel (est. 1868)
 Westfield Chermside
 Marchant Park
 Bunnings Warehouse
 Bald Hills Primary School
 St Paul's School
 Pine Rivers Park
 Strathpine Centre
 Pine Rivers State High School
 Strathpine Primary School

History 

The first private land sale occurred on Gympie Road near Kedron Brook in 1857.  Farms, slaughter yards and tanneries were common sights along Gympie Road prior to World War I.

The tram line from the Brisbane CBD was extended to Kedron Park Hotel in 1914, Lutwyche Cemetery in 1925 and Chermside in 1947.  The tram service was closed in 1968 and replaced with diesel buses.

In 1922, there was a proposal to build Anzac Avenue as a memorial to those who died in World War I. The memorial avenue was to run from Brisbane CBD to Redcliffe (which, at that time, was not connected to Brisbane by road, only by sea). This proposal would use and rename Gympie Road for the northward part of the route and then extend it eastwards towards Redcliffe. However, in its final form, Anzac Avenue commenced at Petrie rather than Brisbane and so Gympie Road was only renamed from Petrie onwards (which is why Gympie Road terminates at Petrie today). The first segment of Anzac Avenue from Petrie to Kallangur was formerly Gympie Road. However, at Kallangur, Anzac Avenue left Gympie Road to go east, leaving parts of Gympie Road going north through Kallangur to Burpengary disconnected (as a name) from the Brisbane to Petrie section. The segment from Kallangur to Burpengary was later renamed Old Gympie Road.

The first integrated shopping mall in Queensland opened on the corner of Gympie Road and Hamilton Road, Chermside in 1957. Originally called the Chermside Drive-in Shopping Centre, it has extended on many occasions and is now Westfield Chermside.

The route was formerly part of the Bruce Highway and carried the designation National Route 1 until the Gateway Bridge opened in 1986.  The route has since had the designations of Alt Route 1 and Metroad 3.

Future 

TransLink is planning for the Kedron to Bracken Ridge section of the Northern Busway that will generally follow Gympie Road.

Interfaces with Airport Link tunnel 
Gympie Road has the following interfaces with the Airport Link tunnel:
 Northbound carriageway - traffic from either direction exiting the Airport Link can enter Gympie Road about 650 metres north of its southern end.
 Southbound carriageway - traffic wishing to proceed in either direction on Airport Link can exit Gympie Road about 500 metres from its southern end.
 Southern end (intersection with Kedron Park Road) - traffic proceeding north from Lutwyche Road and wishing to travel east on Airport Link can cross the southbound carriageway under traffic light control and exit Gympie Road at its southern end.

Upgrade
A project to upgrade the intersection with Anzac Avenue and Dayboro Road at Petrie, at a cost of $30 million, was completed in March 2022.

Major intersections

See also

 List of road routes in Queensland for more details on some of the state routes that intersect with or follow Gympie Road.

References

External links

Brisbane Tramway Museum - Tramway Time Line
TransLink - Northern Busway - Kedron to Bracken Ridge
 
 

Roads in Brisbane